Gábor Gál (born 22 November 1974 in Šaľa) is a Slovak politician. From 2018 to 2020 he served as the Minister of Justice. From 2002 to 2018, he was a member of the National Council.

Background 
Gál studied law at the Comenius University in 1998. Since graduation, he has worked as an attorney. In 2006 he shortly represented the hate-crime victim Hedviga Malinova.

Political career 
In 2002, Gál was first elected into parliament on the list of the Party of the Hungarian Community. In 2009 he co-founded the Most–Híd party, which he represented in parliament until 2018. In 2018, he became the minister of justice, serving until the 2020 Slovak parliamentary election, in which his party failed to pass the representation threshold.

In May 2022, the Slovak police accused Gál of acts of corruption allegedly taking place during his political career.

Personal life 
Gál is married to  Zsuzsanna Gálová, a schoolteacher. They have three children.

References

Most–Híd politicians
People from Šaľa
Living people
1974 births
Party of the Hungarian Community politicians
Comenius University alumni
Hungarians in Slovakia
Members of the National Council (Slovakia) 2002-2006
Members of the National Council (Slovakia) 2006-2010
Members of the National Council (Slovakia) 2010-2012
Members of the National Council (Slovakia) 2012-2016
Members of the National Council (Slovakia) 2016-2020
Justice ministers of Slovakia